The Whatcom Chief is a ferry in Washington state, United States. The ferry carries both pedestrians and vehicles to Lummi Island from Gooseberry Point west of Bellingham, Washington.

The Gooseberry Point terminal is situated on land belonging to the Lummi Nation.

A 35-year lease was agreed between Whatcom County and the Lummi Nation in September 2011.  John Stark, writing in The Bellingham Herald, criticized Whatcom County for the cost of the lease, and for failing to push the Lummi Nation to take it to court by interpreting some Federal precedents that may have allowed access to the ferry terminal without a leasing fee.

Normally the voyage takes eight minutes.
The ferry can accommodate 20 vehicles and 100 pedestrian passengers.
The ferry service is occasionally disrupted due to bad weather as well as propane deliveries as the fuel truck must ride across on the ferry alone.

Replacement

The ferry was built in 1962 and is planned to be replaced by a new vessel in the 2020s. The $35 million project, which includes remodeled docks, will be funded by an increased fare and grants from the state legislature's 2022 transportation package.

References

External links

Ferries of Washington (state)
Whatcom County, Washington